When the Sun Goes Down is the eighth studio album by American country music artist Kenny Chesney. It was released on February 3, 2004 via BNA Records. The album debuted at number one on the US Billboard 200 chart, selling over 550,000 copies in its first week.

The album produced six singles with "There Goes My Life", the title track (a duet with Uncle Kracker), "I Go Back", "The Woman with You", "Anything but Mine", and "Keg in the Closet" all of which charted in the Top 10 on the US Billboard Hot Country Songs chart. "There Goes My Life", the title track, and "Anything but Mine" all reached number one, "I Go Back" and "The Woman with You" both peaked at number 2, and "Keg in the Closet" went to number 6. The title track is also Uncle Kracker's first country chart entry.

Also included on this album is the song "Some People Change", which was later recorded by American country music duo Montgomery Gentry as the title track to their 2006 album of the same name. Their version was released as a single and became a Top 10 hit for them that year.

Track listing

Personnel
As listed in liner notes.

Eddie Bayers - drums 
Wyatt Beard - background vocals 
Mat Britain - steel drums, percussion
Pat Buchanan - electric guitar, harmonica
Melonie Cannon - background vocals 
Kenny Chesney - lead vocals
J. T. Corenflos - electric guitar
Chad Cromwell - drums
Dan Dugmore - steel guitar
Sonny Garrish - steel guitar
Rob Hajacos - fiddle
Tim Hensley - banjo, background vocals 
Wes Hightower - background vocals 
John Hobbs - piano, Hammond B-3 organ
Dann Huff - electric guitar
John Jorgenson - electric guitar 
Paul Leim - drums, percussion, finger snaps, tambourine
B. James Lowry - acoustic guitar, nylon string guitar, bottleneck guitar
Randy McCormick - piano, Hammond B-3 organ, keyboards, synthesizer
Clayton Mitchell - electric guitar
Steve Nathan - Wurlitzer electric piano, Hammond B-3 organ
Sean Paddock - percussion 
Larry Paxton - bass guitar
Gary Prim - piano, Wurlitzer electric piano, synthesizer
Tom Roady - steel drums, percussion
Scotty Sanders - steel guitar 
Neil Thrasher - background vocals 
Uncle Kracker - duet vocals on "When the Sun Goes Down"
John Willis - electric guitar, acoustic guitar, nylon string guitar

Charts

Weekly charts

Year-end charts

Singles

Certifications

References

External links
 

2004 albums
Kenny Chesney albums
BNA Records albums
Albums produced by Buddy Cannon